Japanese whisky is a style of whisky developed and produced in Japan. Whisky production in Japan began around 1870, but the first commercial production was in 1923 upon the opening of the country's first distillery, Yamazaki. Broadly speaking, the style of Japanese whisky is more similar to that of Scotch whisky than other major styles of whisky.

There are several companies producing whisky in Japan, but the two best-known and most widely available are Suntory and Nikka. Both of these produce blended as well as single malt whiskies and blended malt whiskies, with their main blended whiskies being Suntory , and Black Nikka Clear. There are also many special bottlings and limited editions.

Style
The production of Japanese whisky began as a conscious effort to recreate the style of Scotch whisky. Pioneers like Taketsuru carefully studied the process of making Scotch whisky, and went to great lengths in an attempt to recreate that process in Japan. The location of Yoichi in Hokkaidō was chosen particularly for its terrain and climate, which were in many ways reminiscent of Scotland (although financial constraints resulted in the first distillery actually being built in the more convenient location of Yamazaki on the main island).

By 2024, products labeled as "Japanese whisky" will conform to new regulations. Japanese whisky must be fermented, distilled, and aged, and bottled in Japan, use some portion of malted grain in its mash, and use water sourced from Japan.

One facet of the style of Japanese whisky comes from the way in which blended whisky is produced, and the differing nature of the industry in Japan. Despite the recent rise of interest in single malt whiskies, the vast majority of whisky sold in the world is still blended. In Scotland, while a particular brand of blended whisky may be owned by a company that also owns one or more distilleries, it is common for blended whisky bottlers to trade single malt whiskies. The components of a blend may involve malt whisky from a number of distilleries, which may be owned by different companies. In Japan, however, the industry is vertically integrated, meaning whisky companies own both the distilleries and the brands of blended whiskies, and do not trade with their competitors. So a blended whisky in Japan will generally only contain malt whisky from the distilleries owned by that same company.

History
Two of the most influential figures in the history of Japanese whisky are Shinjiro Torii and Masataka Taketsuru. Torii was a pharmaceutical wholesaler and the founder of Kotobukiya (later to become Suntory). He started importing western liquor and he later created a brand called "Akadama Port Wine", based on a Portuguese wine which made him a successful merchant. However, he was not satisfied with this success and so he embarked on a new venture which was to become his life's work: making Japanese whisky for Japanese people. Despite the strong opposition from the company's executives, Torii decided to build the first Japanese whisky distillery in Yamazaki, a suburb of Kyoto, an area so famous for its excellent water that the legendary tea master Sen no Rikyū built his tearoom there.

Torii hired Masataka Taketsuru as a distillery executive. Taketsuru had studied the art of distilling in Scotland, and brought this knowledge back to Japan in the early 1920s. While working for Kotobukiya he played a key part in helping Torii establish the Yamazaki Distillery. In 1934 he left Kotobukiya to form his own company—Dainipponkaju—which would later change its name to Nikka. In this new venture he established the Yoichi distillery in Hokkaidō.

The first westerners to taste Japanese whisky were soldiers of the American Expeditionary Force Siberia who took shore leave in Hakodate in September 1918. A brand called Queen George, described by one American as a "Scotch whisky made in Japan", was widely available. Exactly what it was is unknown, but it was quite potent and probably quite unlike Scotch whisky.

The first whisky made in Japan was the Suntory Shirofuda, released in 1929.

From the mid-1950s, the popularity of whisky began to increase, and the three major brands of Suntory, Daikoku Budoshu (later Mercian Corporation), and Nikka fought for the top position, leading to what was called the "whisky wars". From the 1960s, unique Japanese customs concerning whisky began to appear. Drinking whisky with Japanese food became popular, and the "Bottle keep" system took root in bars and izakaya, and drinking mizuwari (:ja:水割り), a whisky diluted with 2 to 2.5 times the amount of water, became popular among the masses.

In 1971, various restrictions on the whisky trade were lifted, allowing Japanese importers to import foreign whisky without any quantity or value limits. 1973 saw Kirin Company enter the whisky business. In 1980, Suntory shipped 12.4 million cases of "Old" and achieved the world's highest annual sales volume for a single brand. After reaching its peak in 1983, whisky consumption in Japan continued to decline, falling well behind Japanese beer, shōchū, and sake, and in 2008, only 20% of the 1983 level was consumed.

However, whisky consumption began to increase again around 2008 due to the highball craze, and the popularity of whisky increased dramatically in 2014 when the life of Nikka founder Masataka Taketsuru was portrayed in the NHK drama Massan (マッサン). In addition, Japanese whisky began winning awards in international competitions, and exports outside of Japan increased. As a result, demand for Japanese whisky has greatly exceeded supply since the 2010s, and production of many products has been halted. There are two reasons why the supply shortage of whisky has not been easily resolved. The first is that from 1983 to 2008, whisky consumption in Japan continued to decline and companies continued to reduce production, resulting in low inventories. The second reason is that whisky must be stored in casks for a long period of time in order to be finished, so even if companies increased the amount of whisky distilled, they would not be able to ship it immediately.

In 2008, Ichiro Akuto (:ja:肥土伊知郎) started operations at the Chichibu distillery. It was the first time in 35 years that the Japanese government had granted a whisky production license to a new company. The Chichibu distillery won many awards at national and international competitions. The success of the Chichibu distillery led to an increase in the number of companies entering the whisky business, and whisky distilleries began to be built all over Japan.

By the 2020s, Japanese distilleries were importing spirits for use in blends. In 2021, the Japan Spirits & Liqueurs Makers Association announced the definition of "Japanese whisky" as the association's voluntary standard. The 82 companies that are members of the association are bound by this rule, and any whisky made in a manner that does not meet this definition cannot have the words "Japanese whisky" or words meaning Japanese whisky on the label. Also, if the label does not clearly state that the whisky does not meet the definition of Japanese whisky, it will not be allowed to depict the name of a place, person, or flag that evokes Japan. The grace period for this rule is until 2024.

As of 2022, the value of Japan's alcoholic beverage exports was approximately 139.2 billion yen, with Japanese whisky in first place at 56.1 billion yen and sake in second place at 47.5 billion yen.

Reputation

Before 2000, the market for Japanese whiskies was almost entirely domestic, though this changed in 2001 when Nikka's 10-year Yoichi single malt won "Best of the Best" at Whisky Magazines awards.

In the blind tasting organized by Whisky Magazine in 2003, the results of which are published in WM #30, the winners of the category "Japanese Whiskies" were:
 Hibiki 21 YO 43% (blend)
 Nikka Yoichi 10 YO SC 59.9%
 Yamazaki Bourbon Cask 1991 60%
 Karuizawa 17 YO 40% (pure malt)
In the main ranking (covering all categories of whisky) Hibiki 21 YO made it to rank 9 and Nikka Yoichi 10 to rank 14.

In 2004, the 18-year-old Yamazaki was introduced to the US.
Japanese whiskies have been winning top honors in international competitions, notably Suntory. At the 2003 International Spirits Challenge, Suntory Yamazaki won a gold medal, and Suntory whiskies continued to win gold medals every year through 2013, with all three malt whiskies winning a trophy (the top prize) in either 2012 (Yamazaki 18 years old and Hakushu 25 years old) or 2013 (Hibiki 21 years old), and Suntory itself winning distiller of the year in 2010, 2012, and 2013. The resultant acclaim nudged Japan's distilleries to market overseas.

Japanese whisky has won the world's highest award in some category at the World Whiskies Awards, organized by Whisky Magazine, every year from the inaugural event in 2007 until 2022. Whisky Magazine has organized a series of blind tastings which have included Japanese single malts in the lineup, along with malts from distilleries considered to be among the best in Scotland. On more than one occasion, the results have had Japanese single malts (particularly those of Nikka's Yoichi and Suntory's Yamazaki) scoring higher than their Scottish counterparts.

The whisky produced by Venture Whisky Co., Ltd., which owns Chichibu distillery, was also highly evaluated and won the World's Best Blended Limited Release category for five consecutive years from 2017 to 2021 in a competition organized by Whisky Magazine.

In 2022, the Akkeshi distillery won the top prize in the World's Best Blended category and the Asaka distillery won the top prize in the World's Best Blended Malt category at a competition organized by Whisky Magazine.

The growing popularity of Japanese whisky has driven up prices, especially for rarer products. In August 2018, a 50-year-old Yamazaki first edition went for record $343,000 at a Bonhams auction in Hong Kong. In early 2020, Suntory raffled off 100 bottles of Yamazaki 55-year-old in Japan for three million yen ($20,700) each. One of those bottles sold for about $800,000 at a Hong Kong auction in August of that year; in August 2022, "Joker", a whisky made by Akuto Ichiro (:ja:肥土伊知郎), which operates the Chichibu distillery, using Hanyu distillery's original whisky, sold for HK$500,000.

Distilleries

In 2008, the Chichibu distillery (:ja:ベンチャーウイスキー) began operations. It was the first time in 35 years that the Japanese government had granted a new whisky production license. The success of the Chichibu distillery has prompted companies that make sake and shōchū, as well as companies from other industries, to enter the whisky business, and distilleries are being built all over Japan. In addition, companies that had stopped distilling due to a decrease in demand for whisky resumed distilling or started operating new distilleries. As of 2011, when the Shinshu Mars distillery reopened, there were around nine active whisky distilleries in Japan. As of October 2022, there are 59 whisky distilleries in Japan, including those under construction and planned. The distilleries as of 2022 include:

In operation since before 2008 
 Yamazaki: owned by Suntory. Located between Osaka and Kyoto on the main island of Honshū.
 Hakushu: also owned by Suntory. Located in Yamanashi Prefecture.
 Chita: owned by Suntory. Located at the Port of Nagoya Sun Grain facility in Chita, Aichi Prefecture.
 Yoichi: owned by Nikka. Located in Yoichi on the northern island of Hokkaidō.
 Miyagikyo (formerly Sendai): also owned by Nikka. Located in the north of the main island, near the city of Sendai, Miyagi Prefecture.
 Fuji Gotemba: owned by Kirin. Located at the foot of Mount Fuji in Shizuoka Prefecture.
Located in Hyōgo Prefecture.

Operating and re-operating after 2008 
 Chicibu
 Chichibu: near Chichibu in Saitama Prefecture. This is the new Chichibu distillery, founded by Ichiro Akuto (:ja:肥土伊知郎), grandson of the distiller at Hanyu. It opened in 2008.
 Chichibu Daini: This is the second distillery run by Ichiro Akuto. The distillation started in 2019.
 Akkeshi: owned by Japanese grocery wholesaler Kenten Co. Ltd. Located in rural Akkeshi on the island of Hokkaido, it opened in October 2016.
Located in Fukushima Prefecture. The company began whisky production in 1946, but stopped whisky production in 1989. The distillation restarted in March 2016.
Located in Tottori Prefecture. The distillation started in 2021.
Located in Yamanashi Prefecture. The distillation started in 2020.
 Fujisan: owned by Sasakawa Whisky Co. ,Ltd. Located in Yamanashi Prefecture. The distillation started in 2022.
Located in Saitama Prefecture. The company began whisky production in 1946, but stopped whisky distillation in 2000. The distillation restarted in 2021.
Located in Okinawa Prefecture. The company began whisky production in the 1980s, but withdrew from the whisky business before 2008. The distillation restarted in 2016.
 Ikawa: owned by Juzan Co., Ltd. Located in Shizuoka Prefecture. The distillation started in 2020.
Located in Hyōgo Prefecture. The distillation started in 2017.
 Kamui (Rishiri): owned by Kamui Whisky K.K. Located in Hokkaido Prefecture. The distillation started in 2022.
Located in Kagoshima Prefecture. The distillation started in 2017.
Located in Aichi Prefecture. The distillation started in 2014.
 Kobe: owned by GlowStars Inc. Located in Hyōgo Prefecture. The distillation started in October 2022.
 Kuju: owned by Tsuzaki Co.,Ltd. Located in Ōita Prefecture. The distillation started in February 2021.
Located in the village of Kurayoshi, in Tottori Prefecture. The distillation started in 2017.
 Kyoto Miyako: owned by Kyoto Shuzo Co., Ltd. Located in Kyoto Prefecture. The distillation started in Jule 2020.
 Mars
Located in Nagano Prefecture. The company began whisky production in Kagoshima Prefecture in 1953, in Yamanashi Prefecture in 1960, and at this distillery in 1985, but stopped whisky distillation in 1992. The distillation restarted in 2011.
 Tsunuki Mars: owned by Hombo Shuzo Co., Ltd. Located in Kagoshima Prefecture. The distillation started in 2016.
Located in Hiroshima Prefecture. The distillation started in 2022.
Located in Shiga Prefecture. The distillation started in 2016. The brand name is "Amahagan".
 Niigata Kameda: owned by Niigata Shōkibo Jōryūjo. Located in Niigata Prefecture. The distillation started in September March 2019.
Located in Niigata Prefecture. The distillation started in March 2021.
 Nozawa Onsen: owned by Nozawa Onsen distillery. Located in Yamanashi Prefecture. The distillation started in June 2022.
Located in Okayama Prefecture. The distillation started in 2015.
Located in Kagoshima Prefecture. The distillation started in 2019.
 Osuzuyama: owned by Kuroki Honten Co. Ltd. Located in Miyazaki Prefecture. The distillation started in 2019.
Located in Hyōgo Prefecture. The distillation started in June 2021.
Located in Hiroshima Prefecture. The distillation started in October 2018.
Located in Fukuoka Prefecture. The distillation started in August 2021.
Located in Okinawa Prefecture. The distillation started in 2021.
 Shizuoka (ja): owned by Gaiaflow Co., Ltd. Located in Shizuoka Prefecture. The distillation started in October 2016.
Located in Ibaraki Prefecture. The company began whisky production in 1952, but withdrew from the whisky business before 2008. The distillation restarted in September 2022.
Located in Hyōgo Prefecture. The distillation started in 2018.
Located in Toyama Prefecture. The company began whisky production in 1952. The distillery was renovated in 2016 and distilling resumed in 2017.
 Yamaga: owned by Yamaga Distillery Co.,Ltd. Located in Kumamoto Prefecture The distillation started in August 2021.
Located in Ibaraki Prefecture. The distillation started in 2020.
 Yokokawa: owned by At star kabushiki kaisha. Located in Kagoshima Prefecture. The distillation started in January 2022.
Located in Gifu Prefecture. The company began whisky production in the 1970s, but withdrew from the whisky business before 2008. The distillation restarted in 2018.
 Yoshida Denzai: owned by Yoshida Denzai Kogyo Co.,Ltd. Located in Niigata Prefecture. The distillation started in 2022.
 Yuwaku owned by Oriental Brewing. Located in Ishikawa Prefecture. The distillation started in August 2022.
Located in Yamagata Prefecture. The distillation started in 2018.

Under construction/before operation
 Gakkōgawa: owned by Tatenokawa, inc. Located in Yamagata Prefecture. Distillation is scheduled to begin in September 2023.
 Hida Takayama: owned by Funasaka Shuzo. Located in Gifu Prefecture. Distillation is scheduled to begin in April 2023.
 Komoro: owned by Karuizawa Distillers Inc. Located in Nagano Prefecture. Distillation is scheduled to begin in 2023.
 Kōnosu: owned by Hikari shuzo.,Ltd. Located in Saitama Prefecture. Distillation is scheduled to begin in 2025.
 Takebe Orimono (Nanao): owned by Takebe Orimono. Located in Ishikawa Prefecture. Distillation is scheduled to begin in 2023.
 Akita: owned by Dreamlink Co. Ltd. Located in Akita Prefecture.
 Benizakura: owned by Hokkaido Liberty Whisky Inc. Located in Hokkaido Prefecture.
 Karuizawa: owned by Totsuka shuzo Co. Ltd. Located in Nagano Prefecture.
 Shinobu: owned by Niigata Beer Co. Ltd. Located in Niigata Prefecture.

Closed 
 Karuizawa: owned by Mercian (a part of Kirin). Formerly located near the town of Karuizawa in Nagano Prefecture. Folded in 2011.

Consumption

Japanese whisky is consumed either like Scotch whisky or like Japanese shōchū. The bulk of Japanese blended whisky is consumed in cocktails, notably as whisky  (similar to shōchū highballs, known as chūhai), while fine whisky is primarily drunk neat or on the rocks, as with Scotch whisky. Advertising for blended whisky generally features it consumed in a highball, and highballs made with Suntory's Kakubin are branded .

In addition to soda (in a highball), Japanese whisky is often drunk mixed with hot water , particularly in winter, or cold water , particularly in summer, as is done with shōchū. Whisky is also commonly drunk with food, particularly in mixed drinks, especially highballs. The prevalence of mixing whisky with soda or water is particularly attributed to the hot, muggy Japanese summer, hence the popularity of long drinks.

See also
 Outline of whisky
 Izakaya

References

Notes

Bibliography

Articles

Books

External links

 Nikka Company – official website
 Yamazaki Distillery – official website
 Nonjatta – Japanese whisky blog
 Dekanta – Buy Japanese whisky Online